Parakeratosis pustulosa is a cutaneous condition which is exclusively seen in children, usually involving one finger, most commonly the thumb or index finger, with the affected nail showing subungual hyperkeratosis and onycholysis.

See also 
 Nail Anatomy
 List of cutaneous conditions

References 

Conditions of the skin appendages